Virginia Harned (May 29, 1868 – April 29, 1946), born Virginia Hicks, was a noted American stage actress at the turn of the 20th century. She is mainly remembered for playing the title character in the 1895 Broadway premiere of the play Trilby, based on the 1894 George du Maurier novel of the same name. The play had originally premiered, earlier that year, in England with an English actress.

Her second husband was E. H. Sothern, who later married Julia Marlowe, and her third husband was actor William Courtenay, who appeared on stage with her several times and who left her a widow in 1933.

References

External links

Virginia Harned picture gallery(NY Public Library, Billy Rose collection)
charcoal drawn portrait (Univ. of Louisville, Macauley theatre collection)
Virginia Harned: Broadway Photographs(Univ. of South Carolina)
Virginia Harned and Louise Drew in an early electric car 1904

1868 births
1946 deaths
19th-century American actresses
American stage actresses
20th-century American actresses
Actresses from Boston